The  was a steam locomotive operated in Meiji Era Japan from 1872. The sole member of the class was imported from  Vulcan Foundry in the United Kingdom in 1871.

History
The locomotive was one of ten different locomotive types imported from the UK in 1871, and entered service on the first Japanese railway line, which opened between Shimbashi(after-day Shiodome station) in Tokyo and Yokohama (present-day Sakuragicho Station) on 14 October 1872. Initially numbered "No. 1", it was classified "Class 150" in 1909.

In 1911, the locomotive was donated to the Shimabara Railway in Nagasaki, where it once again received the number "1".

Because of its historical value as the first steam locomotive to operate in Japan, it was returned to the Railway Ministry in 1930. In 1997, it became the first railway vehicle in Japan to be designated as an Important Cultural Property.

Preservation
The locomotive is preserved at the Railway Museum in Saitama.

See also
 Japan Railways locomotive numbering and classification

References

2-4-0T locomotives
Steam locomotives of Japan
1067 mm gauge locomotives of Japan
Individual locomotives of Japan
Important Cultural Properties of Japan